Kentucky Route 55 (KY 55) is a  state highway in the U.S. Commonwealth of Kentucky.

The route originates at a junction with U.S. Route 127 in Freedom, Russell County. The route continues through Columbia in Adair County to U.S. Route 68 in Campbellsville, Taylor County, where KY 55 joins US 68 east to Lebanon in Marion County. In Lebanon, KY 55 separates from US 68 and proceeds northward through Springfield in Washington County, Bloomfield in Nelson County, and Taylorsville and Elk Creek in Spencer County. In Shelby County it passes through Finchville and  Shelbyville and continues north through Eminence in Henry County. Roughly three miles south of New Castle, KY 55 intersects U.S. Route 421. The two routes run concurrent for eight miles (13 km) before splitting near Campbellsburg. KY 55 continues north to Prestonville, where it ends at an intersection with U.S. Route 42 and Kentucky Route 36 on the bank of the Ohio River.

Route description

Russell County through Taylor County
The route originates at a junction with U.S. Route 127 in the southern Russell County community of Freedom. The route continues into Adair County through Columbia. In the 2010s, KY 55 was rerouted onto the Columbia Bypass, while the original KY 55 alignment, which went through town and provided Cumberland Parkway access, was re-designated as KY 55 Business.

The route continues northward, bypassing the Green River Lake State Park, and on to U.S. Route 68 in Campbellsville, Taylor County, where KY 55 joins US 68 east, and also runs concurrently with KY 70 for the remaining of that route's concurrency with US 68. US 68 and KY 55 continues north into Marion County.

Marion County through Spencer County
At Lebanon, KY 55 splits from US 68 and continues to Springfield, Washington County, running into downtown Springfield and crossing US 150. It continues north-northwestwardly into eastern Nelson County, providing access to the Bluegrass Parkway and US 62 at Bloomfield. KY 55 goes further north to Spencer County, and goes through Taylorsville.

Shelby County through Carroll County
From Spencer County, KY 55 runs northeast into Shelby County. The route runs through open fields with occasional houses lining the road.  into Shelby County, KY 55 intersects with KY 148 and enters the community of Finchville. In Finchville the route is lined with houses and a few businesses, and the speed limited is reduced to 35 MPH. After meeting the eastern terminus of KY 1848, KY 55 leaves Finchville and heads north toward Shelbyville. In Shelbyville, KY 55 crosses Interstate 64 at Exit 32. Currently, KY 55 widens to 4 lanes with a center turning lane a few tenths of a mile north of the Interstate. However, construction is currently going on to widen the road to 4 lanes starting just south of the interstate as part of the I-64 widening project. North of I-64, many businesses line KY 55 as well as 3 industrial parks.  north of the interstate, KY 55 intersects with US 60 / KY 55 Business and becomes the Shelbyville Bypass (Freedom's Way). The Shelbyville Bypass opened up in November 2010, and is a 4.5 mile 4-lane divided highway.  The Shelbyville Bypass runs north then curves east, crossing KY 53 near Shelby County West Middle School. The route continues east, crossing over Clear Creek and ends north of Shelbyville at an intersection with KY 55 Business. North of the Shelbyville Bypass, KY 55 becomes Eminence Pike and narrows to two-lanes as it heads north passing open fields and houses before entering into Henry County roughly  further north.

After passing by Henry County High School and traveling through New Castle, US 421 and KY 55 split in Campbellsburg.

In Carroll County, KY 55 curves toward the northeast, passing KY 549 and KY 389 in rural sections of the county. After the intersection with KY 389, the route turns toward the northwest and travels along the Kentucky River on the east, with mainly woods on the west. As it nears Presntonville, KY 55 turns toward the west, then northeast, then north at New Castle Pike. In Prestonville, it passes by a few homes before it ends at an intersection with US 42/KY 36, just west of the Kentucky River and south of the Ohio River. The entire route remains two-lanes throughout Henry, Trimble, and Carroll counties.

Major intersections

Special routes

Columbia business route

Kentucky Route 55 Business (KY 55 Business) is a business route of KY 55 in Columbia. The highway runs  between junctions with KY 6177/KY 55 south of Columbia and KY 55 north of Columbia. The route runs north from its southern terminus and passes over the Louie B. Nunn Cumberland Parkway as it enters Columbia.  from KY 55 south of Columbia, the route forms a concurrency with KY 80 and turns northwest as it passes through the heart of town. At an intersection with KY 80 and KY 439, it turns toward the north. KY 55 Business intersects KY 206 as it continues its northward path out of Columbia.

Lebanon spur

Shelbyville business route

Kentucky Route 55 Business (KY 55 Business) is a business route of KY 55 in Shelbyville. The highway runs  between junctions with US 60/KY 55 west of Shelbyville and KY 55 north of Shelbyville. The route was formed in 2010 with the completion of the Shelbyville Bypass (Freedom's Way), which re-routed KY 55 around Shelbyville. The old route that passed through Shelbyville became KY 55 Business. For the first 3.074 miles, the route forms a concurrency with US 60 and is a four-lane highway. From its origin, it passes through a commercial area of Shelbyville with many businesses and shopping centers lining the roadway. Roughly  from its origin, KY 55 Business splits into two one-way routes, Main Street going west to east, and Washington Street going east to west. Here it also forms a concurrency with KY 53. The route passes through downtown Shelbyville and the one-way routes join together just east of downtown. The route then departs with US 60 and KY 53 and turns north and becomes a two-lane highway, passing by multiple businesses and subdivisions. After intersecting KY 43 and KY 2268, it continues north for roughly  before ending at KY 55 north of Shelbyville.

References

External links
KentuckyRoads.com KY 55

 
0055
0055
0055
0055
0055
0055
0055
0055
0055
0055
0055
0055